Spy Cat, also known by its German name Marnie's World, is a 2018 German-Belgian 3D computer-animated adventure comedy film written and directed by brothers Christoph and Wolfgang Lauenstein. The film was loosely inspired by the German fairy tale Town Musicians of Bremen.

Release 
Spy Cat had its world premiere at the Annecy International Animation Film Festival on 13 June 2018, before being theatrically released in Portugal on 14 March 2019. It was released in Germany on 18 April and Belgium on 1 May. The film had a worldwide gross of $3,440,104, but received generally negative reviews from critics.

For its British theatrical release, the film was slightly cut to remove a comical scene of a man urinating against another man accidentally when he's distracted in order to receive a U rating from the British Board of Film Classification. An uncut PG classification was available.

In 2020, an English dubbed version of SpyCat was released with influencer Addison Rae now voicing the character of Marnie.

References

External links 
Spy Cat at filmportal.de (in German)

3D animated films
2018 films
2018 3D films
2018 computer-animated films
2010s German animated films
2010s children's animated films
German 3D films
German animated films
Belgian animated films
Talking animals in fiction
2010s German films